Hafëz Jusuf Azemi (born in Dobrošte) was a Balli Kombëtar fighter from the Dobrošte unit. Having survived World War II and the onslaught of the Yugoslav Partisans, Azemi was forced into exile in the United States. While in exile, Azemi continued fighting for the rights and freedom of Albanians in Yugoslavia. Along with Abas Ermenji, Azemi helped form the Union of  Kosovars (Lidhja Kosovare) as well as many other Albanian organisations in the United States.

Notes

References

Albanian nationalists in Kosovo
Albanian separatism
Balli Kombëtar
Albanians in Yugoslavia
Macedonian people of American descent
Albanian people of World War II
Yugoslav emigrants to the United States